Ndioum is a town in the Saint-Louis Region of Senegal. It is in the Podor Department. The population in 2012 was 16,103, an increase from the 12,407 counted in 2002.

The town received commune status in 1990. It is located on the national road N2.

References

Populated places in Saint-Louis Region
Communes of Senegal